Chemical table file (CT File) is a family of text-based chemical file formats that describe molecules and chemical reactions. One format, for example, lists each atom in a molecule, the x-y-z coordinates of that atom, and the bonds among the atoms.

File formats 
There are several file formats in the family.

The formats were created by MDL Information Systems (MDL), which was acquired by Symyx Technologies then merged with Accelrys Corp., and now called BIOVIA, a subsidiary of Dassault Systemes of Dassault Group.

CT File is an open format, BIOVIA publishes its specification. BIOVIA requires users to register to download the CTFile format specifications.

Molfile 

An MDL Molfile is a file format for holding information about the atoms, bonds, connectivity and coordinates of a molecule. 

The molfile consists of some header information, the Connection Table (CT) containing atom info, then bond connections and types, followed by sections for more complex information.

The molfile is sufficiently common that most, if not all, cheminformatics software systems/applications are able to read the format, though not always to the same degree. It is also supported by some computational software such as Mathematica.

The current de facto standard version is molfile V2000, although, more recently, the V3000 format has been circulating widely enough to present a potential compatibility issue for those applications that are not yet V3000-capable.

Counts line block specification

Bond block specification 
The Bond Block is made up of bond lines, one line per bond, with the following format:

111 222 ttt sss xxx rrr ccc

where the values are described in the following table:

Extended Connection Table (V3000) 

The extended (V3000) molfile consists of a regular molfile “no structure” followed by a single molfile appendix that contains the body of the connection table (Ctab). The following figure shows both an alanine structure and the extended molfile corresponding to it.

Note that the “no structure” is flagged with the “V3000” instead of the “V2000” version stamp. There are two other changes to the header in addition to the version:
 The number of appendix lines is always written as 999, regardless of how many there actually are. (All current readers will disregard the count and stop at M END.)

 The “dimensional code” is maintained more explicitly. Thus “3D” really means 3D, although “2D” will be interpreted as 3D if any non-zero Z-coordinates are found.
Unlike the V2000 molfile, the V3000 extended Rgroup molfile has the same header format as a non-Rgroup molfile.

Counts line 
A counts line is required, and must be first. It specifies the number of atoms, bonds, 3D objects, and Sgroups. It also specifies whether or not the CHIRAL flag is set. Optionally, the counts line can specify molregno. This is only used when the regno exceeds 999999 (the limit of the format in the molfile header line). The format of the counts line is:

SDF 

SDF is one of a family of chemical-data file formats developed by MDL; it is intended especially for structural information. "SDF" stands for structure-data file, and SDF files actually wrap the molfile (MDL Molfile) format. Multiple records are delimited by lines consisting of four dollar signs ($$$$). A feature of the SDF format is its ability to include associated data.

Associated data items are denoted as follows:
>  <Unique_ID>
XCA3464366
 
>  <ClogP>
5.825

>  <Vendor>
Sigma

>  <Molecular Weight>
499.611
 
Multiple-line data items are also supported. The MDL SDF-format specification requires that a hard-carriage-return character be inserted if a single line of any text field exceeds 200 characters.  This requirement is frequently violated in practice, as many SMILES and InChI strings exceed that length.

Other formats of the family 
There are other, less commonly used formats of the family: 
 RXNFile - for representing a single chemical reaction;
 RDFile - for representing a list of records with associated data. Each record can contain chemical structures, reactions, textual and tabular data;
 RGFile - for representing the Markush structures (deprecated, Molfile V3000 can represent Markush structures);
 XDFile - for representing chemical information in XML format.

See also
 Chemical file format#Converting Between Formats

References

External links 
 SDF Prò paid software to process SD files (SDF) from Adroit DI.
 SDF Toolkit free software to process SD files (SDF).
 NCI/CADD Chemical Identifier Resolver generates SD files (SDF) from chemical names, CAS Registry Numbers, SMILES, InChI, InChIKey, ....
 KNIME free software to manipulate data and do datamining, can also read and write SD files (SDF).
 Comparative Toxicology Dashboard service provided by the Environmental Protection Agency (EPA) which generates SD files (SDF) from chemical names, CAS Registry Numbers, SMILES, InChI, InChIKey, ...

Computational chemistry
Chemical file formats